Route 28 is a highway in central Missouri.  Its eastern terminus is at U.S. Route 50 in eastern Gasconade County; its western terminus is at Interstate 44 east of St. Robert.  Route 28 was one of the original state highways and it has changed very little.  Its termini are currently the same as they were in 1922.

Major intersections

References

028
Transportation in Pulaski County, Missouri
Transportation in Maries County, Missouri
Transportation in Gasconade County, Missouri